David or Dave Peck may refer to:

David J. Peck (1826–1855), American physician
David W. Peck (1902–1990), American jurist
Dave Peck (musician), see Piano Jazz
Dave Peck (racquetball) who played with Marty Hogan

See also
David Richmond-Peck (born 1974), Canadian actor
David Peck Todd (1855–1939), American astronomer